Judiciary Square is a Washington Metro station in Washington, D.C. on the Red Line. It is located in the Judiciary Square neighborhood in the Northwest quadrant of the city, with entrances at 4th and D Street and 5th and F Street. It serves the many courthouses and municipal buildings in the area. The 5th and F Street entrance is located in the National Law Enforcement Officers Memorial, which incorporates the escalators and elevators into its architecture.

History
Service began on March 27, 1976. This station is also the birthplace of the Metro, as the initial groundbreaking was held here on December 9, 1969.

During a September 2012 refurbishment of the station, new signage was installed. Similar signage can be found at the Gallery Place, NoMa–Gallaudet U station, Morgan Boulevard, Grosvenor-Strathmore, and Largo Town Center stations. It is the only station with two-sided platforms with elevators between each platform and street.

From March 26 to June 28, 2020, this station was closed due to the 2020 coronavirus pandemic.

Between January 15 to January 21, 2021, this station was closed because of security concerns due to the 2021 Inauguration.

Station layout 
The station has 2 tracks with 2 side platforms and a mezzanine on either end. Each mezzanine has fare gates and escalators reaching the street level. At the northwest end of the platforms, a pair of elevators directly serve the platforms, each with a single fare gate and ticket machine.

Notable places nearby 

 Federal courthouses: United States Court of Appeals for the Armed Forces, E. Barrett Prettyman United States Courthouse, United States Court of Appeals for Veterans Claims, United States Tax Court
 Municipal buildings: H. Carl Moultrie Courthouse, District of Columbia Court of Appeals, and One Judiciary Square
 United States Department of Labor
 Fraternal Order of Police Headquarters
 Government Accountability Office
 Federal Bureau of Investigation Washington Field Office
 Georgetown University Law Center
 Washington Metropolitan Area Transit Authority Headquarters
 National Building Museum
 National Law Enforcement Officers Memorial
 United States Army Corps of Engineers Headquarters

References

External links

 The Schumin Web Transit Center: Judiciary Square Station
 F Street entrance from Google Maps Street View
 4th Street entrance from Google Maps Street View

Judiciary Square
Stations on the Red Line (Washington Metro)
Washington Metro stations in Washington, D.C.
Railway stations in the United States opened in 1976
1976 establishments in Washington, D.C.
Railway stations located underground in Washington, D.C.